Donald Scott Lydy (born October 26, 1968) is an American former professional baseball outfielder. He played for the Oakland Athletics of the Major League Baseball (MLB) during the 1993 season.

References

1968 births
Living people
American expatriate baseball players in Canada
American expatriate baseball players in Japan
Arizona League Athletics players
Baseball players from Arizona
Birmingham Barons players
Charlotte Knights players
Edmonton Trappers players
Fukuoka Daiei Hawks players
Huntsville Stars players
Madison Muskies players
Major League Baseball outfielders
New Orleans Zephyrs players
Nippon Professional Baseball outfielders
Oakland Athletics players
Reno Silver Sox players
Rochester Red Wings players
Sioux Falls Canaries players
Sportspeople from Mesa, Arizona
Southern Oregon A's players
Tacoma Tigers players
Winnipeg Goldeyes players
South Mountain Cougars baseball players